WPHA-CD, UHF (UHF digital channel 24), is a low-powered, Class A television station licensed to Philadelphia, Pennsylvania, United States. Its transmitter is located in the Roxborough, Philadelphia antenna farm. The station is owned by D.T.V. LLC of Cheyenne, Wyoming.

Digital channels
The station's digital signal is multiplexed:

Although WPHA mostly airs infomercials, they are required to meet E/I programming rules as Class A station. They air a 2-hour block of children's programming on Tuesday and Friday mornings, currently featuring Zebby's Zoo and Do You Ever Wonder?.

Aside from E/I programming, WPHA airs a weekly talk series Love to Talk, featuring topics that are important to the community. The show airs on Friday mornings.

References

External links

RabbitEars.Info -- Station Information for Facility ID 72278 (WPHA)
TV Fool website (local TV signals, distance, direction and strength)

PHA-CD
Low-power television stations in the United States
Television channels and stations established in 1999
1999 establishments in Pennsylvania